John True Beynon (July 12, 1913 – October 17, 1989) was an American football player. He was the quarterback for the Illinois Fighting Illini football team from 1932 to 1934 and was selected as a first-team All-Big Ten player in 1933 and 1934.

Early years
Beynon was born in Chicago in 1913 and grew up in Rockford, Illinois.

University of Illinois
Beynon attended the University of Illinois.  He was the quarterback of the Illinois Fighting Illini football team from 1932 to 1934.  He was selected as a first-team player on the 1933 and 1934 All-Big Ten Conference football teams. He was also selected in 1934 as a second-team All-American by Red Grange Universal Service and a third-team All-American by the Newspaper Enterprise Association.

Later years
In 1935, Beynon was hired as an assistant football coach at Drake. He later attended law school at the University of Illinois and served as a backfield coach and radio sports announcer during law school. He interrupted his legal career to serve in the military during World War II. He became the first public defender in Winnebago County, Illinois, in 1966, and later became an Illinois state court judge.  He died in 1989.

References

1913 births
1989 deaths
Sportspeople from Springfield, Illinois
Players of American football from Illinois
American football quarterbacks
Illinois Fighting Illini football players
Public defenders